The Little Swan River is a river in northeastern Kenora District in northwestern Ontario, Canada. It is in the James Bay drainage basin and is a right tributary of the Atikameg River.

The Atikameg River begins at an unnamed swamp and flows north to its mouth at the Atikameg River. The Atikameg River flows to James Bay.

References

Sources

Rivers of Kenora District